Ezeagu is a Local Government Area of Enugu State, Nigeria. Its headquarters is in the town of Aguobu-Owa. Eziagu is known for Agriculture.

Localities 

 Umuana-ndiuno
 Obinofia Ndiagu

References

Local Government Areas in Enugu State
Local Government Areas in Igboland